Jack Thomas (born 25 April 1999) is a speedway rider from England.

Speedway career 
Thomas rides in the top two tiers of British Speedway. In 2019 he rode for the champion Leicester Lions during the SGB Championship 2019.

In 2022, he will ride in the highest league for King's Lynn Stars during the SGB Premiership 2022. He also signed the Oxford Cheetahs for the SGB Championship 2022. The Cheetahs were returning to action after a 14-year absence from British Speedway. His 2022 season came to an early end after he broke both wrists while racing for King's Lynn.

In 2023, he signed for Ipswich Witches for the SGB Premiership 2023 as their rising star and also signed for Poole Pirates for the SGB Championship 2023 but suffered serious injuries (including two broken vertebrae and a broken neck) in March practice, which ruled him out for the season.

References 

Living people
1999 births
British speedway riders
Birmingham Brummies riders
Glasgow Tigers riders
King's Lynn Stars riders
Leicester Lions riders
Newcastle Diamonds riders
Oxford Cheetahs riders
Sportspeople from Norwich